Jānis Krasovskis (born 12 February 1936) is a Latvian athlete. He competed in the men's pole vault at the 1960 Summer Olympics, representing the Soviet Union - he achieved 4.40m and took 13th place.

References

1936 births
Living people
Athletes (track and field) at the 1960 Summer Olympics
Latvian male pole vaulters
Olympic athletes of the Soviet Union
Place of birth missing (living people)
Soviet male pole vaulters